Mesa Redonda Internacional (Spanish for International Round Table) is a Latin American communist news analysis talk-show broadcast by teleSUR live from Havana, Cuba, on Thursday nights. The program is, according to the description given of it on the network's website, "a television program for the integration of various forms of (political and social) thought throughout our continent" (Latin America). The program is sometimes hosted by Randy Alonso Falcón or Arleen Rodríguez Derivet, both Cuban journalists and contributors in various media on the Internet, including Cubadebate.

The program is also broadcast in Cuba via public-owned media in a sporadic way.

References

External links
Cuban Institute of Radio and Television Official Site 
Cubadebate: Cuban news, opinion and debate site 

Television in Cuba
Mass media in Havana
Cuban television shows